The 2001 season of the Ukrainian Championship was the 10th season of Ukraine's women's football competitions. The championship ran from 25 July to 28 September 2001.

As the previous season, the clubs were set in two groups with the top two from each contesting the title in championship round robin tournament.

Teams

Team changes

Name changes
 SKIF Lviv changed its name to Lvivianka Lviv.
 Luhanochka last competed in 1993

First stage

Group West

Group East

Finals

Gold match

References

External links
WFPL.ua
Women's Football.ua

2001
2001–02 in Ukrainian association football leagues
2000–01 in Ukrainian association football leagues
Ukrainian Women's League
Ukrainian Women's League